The 2019–20 Holy Cross Crusaders men's basketball team represented the College of the Holy Cross during the 2019–20 NCAA Division I men's basketball season. The Crusaders, led by first-year head coach Brett Nelson, played their home games at the Hart Center in Worcester, Massachusetts as members of the Patriot League. They finished the season 3–29, 2–16 in Patriot League play to finish in last place. They lost in the first round of the Patriot League tournament to Bucknell.

Previous season 
The Crusaders finished the 2018–19 season 16–17, 6–12 in Patriot League play to finish in last place. They defeated Lafayette in the first round of the Patriot League tournament before losing to Bucknell in the quarterfinals.

Following the season, head coach Bill Carmody announced his retirement. On July 3, 2019, the school named Marquette assistant Brett Nelson as Carmody's replacement.

Roster

Schedule and results 

|-
!colspan=9 style=|Non-conference regular season

|-
!colspan=9 style=|Patriot League regular season

|-
!colspan=9 style=| Patriot League tournament

Notes

References 

Holy Cross Crusaders men's basketball seasons
Holy Cross
Holy Cross Crusaders men's basketball
Holy Cross Crusaders men's basketball